Gibberrhynchium is a small Afrotropical genus of potter wasps. 

It was considered to be monotypic with the only species being Gibberhynchium masariforme (Giordani Soika 1934), which is widely distributed though Central Africa (Democratic Republic of Congo, Malawi, Tanzania, Zambia and Zimbabwe). 

A second species, Gibberrhynchium gibber, was described by Josef Gusenleitner in 2002 from the Democratic Republic of Congo.

References

 Carpenter, J.M., J. Gusenleitner & M. Madl. 2010a. A Catalogue of the Eumeninae (Hymenoptera: Vespidae) of the Ethiopian Region excluding Malagasy Subregion. Part II: Genera Delta de Saussure 1885 to Zethus Fabricius 1804 and species incertae sedis. Linzer Biologischer Beitrage 42 (1): 95-315.

Biological pest control wasps
Potter wasps